Indic Siyaq Numbers is a Unicode block containing a specialized subset of the Arabic script that was used for accounting in India under the Mughals by the 17th century through the middle of the 20th century.

Block

History
The following Unicode-related documents record the purpose and process of defining specific characters in the Indic Siyaq Numbers block:

References 

Unicode blocks